Oluyole is a Local Government Area in Oyo State, Nigeria. Its headquarters are in the town of Idi Ayunre.

It has an area of 629 km and a population of 202,725 at the 2006 census.

The postal code of the area is 200.

It shares boundaries with four Local Governments, viz.: Ibadan South West, Ibadan South East, Ona Ara Local Government and Ido Local Government – all within Ibadan metropolis.  It also shares boundaries with Ogun State through Obafemi Owode, Odeda and Ijebu North Local Governments.

References

Local Government Areas in Oyo State
Local Government Areas in Yorubaland